Dostoevsky is a Russian surname. Notable people with the surname include:

Fyodor Dostoevsky, Russian writer and essayist
Mikhail Dostoevsky, Fyodor's brother, short story writer and publisher
Andrey Dostoevsky, Fyodor's younger brother, an architect

See also 
MS Fyodor Dostoevsky, the cruise ship
 L. Tolstoy and Dostoyevsky, an essay by Dmitry Merezhkovsky
 Dostoevskaya (disambiguation), a feminine surname version

Russian-language surnames